Fontarrón is an administrative neighborhood (barrio) of Madrid belonging to the district of Moratalaz. It is 0.964574 km² in size.

References 

Wards of Madrid
Moratalaz